Buka can refer to:

 Buka, Papua New Guinea, the capital of Autonomous Region of Bougainville
 Buka Rural LLG in Papua New Guinea
 Buka, Pomeranian Voivodeship (north Poland)
 Buka, Uzbekistan (Buká), a town in the Tashkent Province of Uzbekistan
 Buka Island, the second largest island in the Papua New Guinean province of Bougainville
 Buka (music), the opening of a gamelan composition
 Buka cloak, a Noongar Southwest Australian indigenous word describing, usually, a kangaroo-skin cloak worn draped over one shoulder.